Abu Rudeis Airport  is an airport serving Abu Rudeis, Egypt, a city in the Sinai Peninsula on the Gulf of Suez.

Airlines and destinations

See also
Transport in Egypt
List of airports in Egypt

References

External links
 OurAirports - Egypt
   Great Circle Mapper - Abu Rudeis
 Abu Rudeis Airport
 Google Earth

Airports in Egypt